John William Hill or often J.W. Hill (January 13, 1812 – September 24, 1879) was a British-born American artist working in watercolor, gouache, lithography, and engraving. Hill's work focused primarily upon natural subjects including landscapes, still lifes, and ornithological and zoological subjects. In the 1850s, influenced by John Ruskin and Hill's association with American followers of the Pre-Raphaelite Brotherhood, his attention turned from technical illustration toward still life and landscape.

Life

Born in London, Hill was the son of British aquatint engraver John Hill. He emigrated with his parents from London to the United States in 1819, initially living in Philadelphia. In 1822 the family moved to New York, where Hill apprenticed in aquatint engraving in his father's shop.

In 1838 Hill married Catherine Smith. Their children included the astronomer George William Hill and the painter John Henry Hill.

He died in West Nyack, New York.

Work

In watercolor and aquatint engravings, Hill employed a stipple technique, building up planes of softly graduated colors made of tiny brushstrokes–a process commonly seen in painted miniatures. Applied to a larger scale on canvas the result was a form of objective realism in contrast with more common romanticized works of mid-19th century American painting. In 1829, at the age of 17, Hill began exhibiting watercolors and engravings produced in his father's studio at the Brooklyn Art Association and the National Academy of Design. In 1833, at the age of 21, Hill was elected to associate membership in the National Academy of Design.

In his early twenties Hill began work for the New York State Geological Survey, first creating a series of topographic studies and overhead views of principle American cities and towns. This work was distinct for its accuracy of aerial perspective and recording minute architectural detail. These portraits of urban settlement required frequent travel to observe, sketch, and map before creating finished watercolor studies. The completed watercolors were then recreated as color  lithographic art and published by the Smith Brothers, a New York City publisher.

Hill's work with the New York State Geological Survey continued later with his illustration of  James Ellsworth De Kay's Zoology of New York State, or; The New-York Fauna. Part II, Birds published in 1844. Like John James Audubon's bird portraits, Hill's were painted with an objective eye, documenting accurate anatomy and colors, and capturing the animal's natural countenance.

While in his early forties Hill read John Ruskin's Modern Painters, and became fascinated with the Pre-Raphaelite Brotherhood. The Pre-Raphaelite movement's combination of realism with increased emotional content appealed to Hill. Hill championed Pre-Raphaelite painting methods in the United States, but was less fascinated with their ideals. In 1863, with art critic Clarence Cook, geologist Clarence King, and architect Russell Sturgis, Hill helped to found the Society for the Advancement of Truth in Art. For the remainder of Hill's life he produced landscapes, mostly  of the mountainous areas of New England and New York state. Hill's paintings and engravings are found in the collections of the Brooklyn Museum, the Amon Carter Museum, Fogg Museum, the Hood Museum of Art, the National Gallery of Art, the Hudson River Museum, and the Metropolitan Museum of Art.

References

 Falk, Peter Hasting. Who Was Who in American Art: 1564-1975. Sound View Press: 1999. .
 Hill, John Henry. John William Hill: An Artist's Memorial. 1888.
Hill, Mary Brawley. "Landscapes of Rockland County and the Hudson by Three Generations of Artists Who Resided in West Nyack: John Hill (1770-1850), John William Hill (1812-1879), John Henry Hill (1839-1922)." Manuscript commissioned by the Historical Society of Rockland County, 1991 (William H. Gerdts and Abigail Booth Gerdts Collection, National Gallery of Art Library.
Pennington, E. C. & Kelly, James C. The South on Paper: Line, Color and Light (South Carolina Department of Natural Resources, 1985): p. 42.
Sparling, Tobin Andrews, ed. American Scenery: The Art of John and John William Hill. Exh. cat. New York Public Library, 1985.
 Staley, A. and Newall, C. Pre-Raphaelite Vision: Truth to Nature.  Tate: 2004. .
 Stebbins, Theodore E., Virginia Anderson and Melissa Renn. The Last Ruskinians: Charles Eliot Norton, Charles Herbert Moore, and Their Circle. Harvard University Art Museum: 2007. .
 Townsend, Joyce H. Pre-Raphaelite Painting Techniques. Tate: 2004. .

External links

Work by John William Hill in the Brooklyn Museum
Work by John William Hill in the Hood Museum of Art, Dartmouth College
Work by John William Hill in the Metropolitan Museum of Art
Work by John William Hill in the National Gallery of Art
Artwork by John William Hill
Art and the empire city: New York, 1825-1861, an exhibition catalog from The Metropolitan Museum of Art (fully available online as PDF), which contains material on Hill (see index)

1812 births
1879 deaths
19th-century American painters
American male painters
English emigrants to the United States
Landscape artists
American bird artists
People from West Nyack, New York
19th-century American male artists